Geranium palustre is a perennial species of flowering plant belonging to the family Geraniaceae.

Its native range is Europe to Southwestern Siberia and Caucasus.

The plant has leaves that are divided into 5-7 lobes, and large (3 cm in diameter) bright magenta flowers with a white centre and 5 veined petals.

References

palustre